GH, also known a EA-1211, is an organophosphate nerve agent of the G-series.

References

G-series nerve agents
Acetylcholinesterase inhibitors
Methylphosphonofluoridates